In written Latin, the apex (plural "apices") is a mark with roughly the shape of an acute accent  which was sometimes placed over vowels to indicate that they are long.

The shape and length of the apex can vary, sometimes within a single inscription. While virtually all apices consist of a line sloping up to the right, the line can be more or less curved, and varies in length from less than half the height of a letter to more than the height of a letter. Sometimes, it is adorned at the top with a distinct hook, protruding to the left. Rather than being centered over the vowel it modifies, the apex is often considerably displaced to the right.

In the 17th century, with a specialized shape distinct from that of the acute accent, a curved diacritic by the name of "apex" was adopted to mark final nasalization in the early Vietnamese alphabet, which already had an acute accent diacritic that was used to mark one of the tones.

Details 

Although hardly known by most modern Latinists, the use of the sign was actually quite widespread during classical and postclassical times. The reason why it so often passes unnoticed lies probably in its smallish size and usually thinner nature in comparison with the lines that compose the letter on which it stands. Yet the more careful observer will soon start to notice apices in the exhibits of any museum, not only in many of the more formal epigraphic inscriptions, but also in handwritten palaeographic documents. However, otherwise punctilious transcriptions of the material customarily overlook this diacritic.

Other expedients, like a reduplication of the vowels, are attested in archaic epigraphy; but the apex is the standard vowel-length indication that was used in classical times and throughout the most flourishing period of the Roman education system. Its use is recommended by the best grammarians, like Quintilian, who says that writing the apex is necessary when a difference of quantity in a vowel can produce a different meaning in a word, as in malus and ma᷄lus or liber and líber or rosa and rosa᷄.

In modern Latin orthography, long vowels are sometimes marked by a macron, a sign that had always been used, and still is, to mark metrically long syllables (more recently called heavy syllables). To confuse matters further, the acute accent is sometimes used in Latin to mark stressed syllables, as in Spanish, when the macron is not used.

Identification with the sicilicus 

The apex is often contrasted with another ancient Latin diacritic, the sicilicus, which is said to have been used above consonants to denote that they should be pronounced double. However, in his article Apex and Sicilicus, Revilo P. Oliver argues that they are one and the same sign, a geminationis nota, which was used over any letter to indicate that the letter should be read twice. The distinction between a sicilicus that was used above consonants and an apex that was applied to vowels is then completely artificial: "There is no example of this mark [the sicilicus] that can be distinguished from an apex by any criterion other than its presence above a letter that is not a long vowel." "No ancient source says explicitly that there were two different signs; ...". The presence of this sign, whatever its name, over a consonant is very scarcely attested.

If Revilo P. Oliver is right, the apex as a sign denoting vowel length would have its origin in the time when long vowels were written double. Then, when long vowels ceased to be regularly written twice, the usage of the sicilicus above vowels evidently remained, even after it fell out of use above consonants, and the apex, as it was now called, was redefined as a sign denoting the phonematic feature of vowel length, rather than as a purely orthographic shorthand.

However, Oliver's view that the two marks were identical has recently been challenged; see sicilicus.

Usage in Middle Vietnamese 
In the 17th and 18th centuries, the Vietnamese alphabet incorporated both acute and apex marks. The acute indicates rising tone, while the apex marked final nasalization. In his 1651 , Alexandre de Rhodes makes it clear that the apex is a distinct diacritic:

As with other accent marks, a tone mark can appear atop the apex.

According to canon law historian Roland Jacques, the apex indicated a final labial-velar nasal , an allophone of  that is peculiar to the Hanoi dialect to the present day.

The apex is often mistaken for a tilde in modern reproductions of early Vietnamese writing, such as in Phạm Thế Ngũ's .

Vietnamese examples 
Obtained from Dictionarium Annamiticum Lusitanum et Latinum, a trilingual Vietnamese, Portuguese and Latin dictionary by Jesuit Alexandre de Rhodes.

See also 
 Acute accent
 Latin spelling

References 

Latin-script diacritics
Inscriptions
Palaeography
Palaeographic letters
Vietnamese language